The 1980 British Grand Prix (formally the XXXIII Marlboro British Grand Prix) was a Formula One motor race held at Brands Hatch on 13 July 1980. It was the eighth round of the 1980 Formula One season. The race was held over 76 laps of the 4.207-km (2.614-mile) circuit for a total race distance of 319.73 km (198.67 miles).

The race was won by Australian driver, Alan Jones driving a Williams FW07B. The win was Jones' eighth Formula One Grand Prix victory and his fourth of the year. Including the non-championship Spanish Grand Prix it was Jones' third victory in a row as he built his charge towards becoming the 1980 World Drivers' Champion. Jones won by eleven seconds over the man becoming his arch-rival, Brazilian driver Nelson Piquet driving a Brabham BT49. Third, and the only other car to finish on the lead lap, was Jones' Williams Grand Prix Engineering teammate, Argentine driver Carlos Reutemann.

Report

Background
In the two weeks between the French and British Grands Prix, Brabham decided to replace Ricardo Zunino with Mexican driver Héctor Rebaque, while the Shadow team closed down. There were still 27 cars on the entry list, as RAM Racing entered year-old Williams FW07s for Rupert Keegan and South African female racer Desiré Wilson.

Qualifying
For the third consecutive race, a Ligier driver took pole position, Didier Pironi setting a time some 5.8 seconds faster than the pole time set by Ronnie Peterson at the previous Grand Prix at Brands Hatch two years before. Pironi's teammate Jacques Laffite was alongside on the front row, while the works Williams filled the second row with championship leader Alan Jones ahead of Carlos Reutemann. On the third row were Nelson Piquet in the Brabham and Bruno Giacomelli in the Alfa Romeo, and on the fourth were Alain Prost in the McLaren and Patrick Depailler in the second Alfa Romeo. Mario Andretti in the Lotus and Derek Daly in the Tyrrell completed the top ten.

The Renaults and Ferraris had issues with their Michelin tyres, and Jean-Pierre Jabouille and René Arnoux could only manage 13th and 16th respectively for the French team, while Gilles Villeneuve and reigning champion Jody Scheckter struggled to 19th and 23rd respectively for the Italian outfit, and were both out-qualified by Keegan's private Williams. Wilson failed to qualify in the other private Williams.

Race 
At the start, Pironi led with Laffite holding off Jones and Piquet passing Reutemann for fourth. Pironi held a comfortable lead until lap 19, when he suffered a deflating front tyre followed by a long pit stop to replace it. Laffite led until he too suffered a deflating tyre, causing him to spin off into catch fencing at Hawthorn Bend on lap 31. Thereafter, Jones retained a comfortable advantage over Piquet and Reutemann, while Pironi made a charge from the back of the field, reaching fifth before suffering another tyre failure on lap 64. It was later established that the Ligiers' problems were caused by their wheel rims cracking.

Jones eventually took the chequered flag 11 seconds ahead of Piquet, for his fourth victory of the season and his third in succession (including the Spanish Grand Prix, which was subsequently stripped of its World Championship status). Reutemann, the last man on the lead lap, finished 2.2 seconds behind Piquet, with the minor points going to Daly, his Tyrrell teammate Jean-Pierre Jarier, and Prost.

In the Drivers' Championship, Jones doubled his lead over Piquet to six points, while in the Constructors' Championship Williams moved 18 points clear of Ligier.

This race turned out to be the last for Depailler, who died three weeks later while testing at Hockenheim ahead of the German Grand Prix.

Classification

Qualifying

Race

Championship standings after the race

Drivers' Championship standings

Constructors' Championship standings

Note: Only the top five positions are included for both sets of standings.

References

British Grand Prix
British Grand Prix
Grand Prix
British Grand Prix